Atlit Yam is an ancient submerged Neolithic village off the coast of Atlit, Israel. It has been carbon-dated as to be between 8,900 and 8,300 years old. Among the features of the 10-acre site is a stone circle.

History

Atlit Yam provides the earliest known evidence for an agro-pastoral-marine subsistence system on the Levantine coast. The site of Atlit Yam has been carbon-dated to be between 8,900 and 8,300 years old (calibrated dates) and belongs to the final Pre-Pottery Neolithic B period. It is currently between 8–12 m (25–40 ft) beneath sea level in the Mediterranean Sea, in the Bay of Atlit, at the mouth of the Oren river on the Carmel coast. It covers an area of ca. 40,000 square meters (10 acres).

Underwater excavations have uncovered rectangular houses and a well. The site was covered by the eustatic rise of sea levels after the end of the last Ice Age. It is assumed that the contemporary coastline was about 1 km (a half-mile) west of the present coast. Piles of fish ready for trade or storage have led scientists to conclude that the village was abandoned suddenly. An Italian study led by Maria Pareschi of the Italian National Institute of Geophysics and Volcanology in Pisa indicates that a volcanic collapse of the eastern flank of Mount Etna 8,500 years ago would likely have caused a 10-storey (40 m or 130 ft) tsunami to engulf some Mediterranean coastal cities within hours. Some scientists point to the apparent abandonment of Atlit Yam around the same time as further evidence that indeed, such a tsunami did occur.

Archaeological findings

Submerged settlements and shipwrecks have been found on the Carmel coast since 1960, in the wake of large-scale sand quarrying. In 1984, marine archaeologist Ehud Galili spotted ancient remains whilst surveying the area for shipwrecks. Remains of rectangular houses and hearth-places have been found. Also found was a well that currently lies 10.5 m (35 ft) below sea-level, constructed of dry-stone walling, with a diameter of 1.5 m (5 ft) and a depth of 5.5 m (20 ft) lower. The fill contained flints, artifacts of ground stone and bone, and animal bones in two separate layers. The upper layer contained partly articulated animal bones, which presumably, were thrown in after the well went out of use. Other round structures at the site may also be wells. Galili believes that the water in the wells gradually became contaminated with seawater, forcing the inhabitants to abandon their homes.

A stone semicircle, containing seven 600 kg (1,300 lb) megaliths, has been found. The stones have cup marks carved into them and are arranged around a freshwater spring, which suggests that they may have been used for a water ritual.

Ten flexed burials have been discovered, both inside the houses and in their vicinity. The skeletons of a woman and child, found in 2008, have revealed the earliest known cases of tuberculosis. Bone fish-hooks and piles of fish bones ready for trade or storage point to the importance of marine resources. The men are thought to have dived for seafood, as four skeletons with ear damage have been found, probably caused by diving in cold water. Anthropomorphic stone stelae have been found. The lithics include arrowheads, sickle-blades, and axes.

An excavation was mounted by the University of Haifa on October 1, 1987. A complete human burial, in an excellent state of preservation, was discovered under 10m of water on October 4 with the skeleton oriented in a flexed position and laid on her right side. Subsequent carbon dating of plant material recovered from the burial placed the age of the site at 8000 +-200 years.

Animal bones and plant remains also have been preserved. Animal bones come mainly from wild species. The plant remains include wild grape, poppy, and caraway seeds. Granary weevils indicate the presence of stored grain.  Pollen analysis and the remains of marsh plants indicates the local presence of swamps.

Radiocarbon dating 
The settlement has been dated by three radiocarbon dates from submerged branches:

References

External links

1984 archaeological discoveries
Archaeological sites in Israel
History of fishing
Maritime archaeology in Israel
Megalithic monuments in the Middle East
Neolithic settlements
Stone circles in Asia
Prehistoric sites in Israel
7th-millennium BC establishments
Populated places established in the 7th millennium BC
Underwater archaeological sites
Pre-Pottery Neolithic B